Xu Zhengxi (born 5 May 1985), also known as Jeremy Tsui, Izz Xu, Jones Xu or Jeremy Jones Xu is a Chinese actor.

Career 
He first gained attention with his portrayal of male lead Ji Rufeng in 2011 modern romance drama Waking Love Up, and was able to revitalise his career with the antagonist roles Yuwen Hu in the historical drama The Legend of Dugu and Li Wangping in Republican drama Siege in Fog.

Filmography

Film

Television series

Awards and nominations

References

External links
 
 Xu Zhengxi at Hong Kong Cinemagic
 Xu Zhengxi at Chinesemov.com

1985 births
21st-century Chinese male actors
Living people
Chinese male film actors
Chinese male television actors
Male actors from Shanghai